Eastern Region or East Region may refer to:

Eastern Region (Abu Dhabi): Al Ain
Eastern Region, Ghana
Eastern Region (Iceland)
Eastern Region, Nepal
Eastern Region, Nigeria
Eastern Region, Serbia
Eastern Region, Uganda
Eastern Region of British Railways
AAA Eastern Region, a high school sports region of large high schools in the state of Virginia
 Eastern Region Women's Football League, England
 Eastern Region (Northern Ireland football)
East Region (Cameroon)
East Region, Singapore
Est Region, Burkina Faso

See also
Central Region (disambiguation)
Eastern Province (disambiguation)
Northern Region (disambiguation)
Southern Region (disambiguation)
Western Region (disambiguation)